Vladimir Matijević (2 January 1957 – 8 July 2015) was Bosnian-Herzegovinian football player. He earned three caps for Yugoslavia.

Club career
He spent his entire career with hometown club Velež Mostar, captained them and won two Yugoslav Cups with Velež.

International career
Dada Matijević made his debut for Yugoslavia in a March 1980 Balkan Cup match against Romania and has earned a total of 3 caps, scoring no goals. His final international was a September 1984 friendly match away against Scotland.

Personal life and death
After retiring as a player, he had a bar in Mostar. He died of a long illness in 2015.

Honours
Yugoslav Cup: 2
 1981, 1986

References

External links

 Profile at Serbian federation official site

1957 births
2015 deaths
Sportspeople from Mostar
Association football defenders
Association football utility players
Bosnia and Herzegovina footballers
Yugoslav footballers
Yugoslavia international footballers
Olympic footballers of Yugoslavia
Footballers at the 1980 Summer Olympics
FK Velež Mostar players
Yugoslav First League players